The Federal Company was a Memphis, Tennessee based flour milling company with a market share of the southeastern United States.

Federal had several subsidiaries, Dixie Portland Flour Mills (flour) and Cosby-Hodges Milling Company (animal feed).

In 1972, Federal purchased Great Western Foods (GWF) of Knoxville, Tennessee from Great Western United Corporation. A Justice Department antitrust lawsuit  was filed by assistant district attorney Thomas E. Kauper, to require the divestment of GWF. The lawsuit stated Federal had 11 percent of the regional flour milling capacity, had 15% of the hard wheat bakery flour market, and 5% of the home market (bakery was approximately 75% of Federal's flour business). GWF had 6% of the capacity, 3% of the bakery market (primarily soft wheat bakery flour), and 9% of the home market.

Federal attempted to launch the "Gingham Girl" brand of premium flour in 1964, but it never achieved much market share despite marketing effort. By the 1970s, Federal was producing about 50 private-label and non-premium brands, but their sales had been in a steep decline from 1965 to 1974.

Federal Company and its subsidiary Dixie Portland Flour Mills purchased GWF in 1972. As Federal had 11% of the flour market, a Justice Department assistant district attorney in the antitrust division, Thomas E. Kauper, filed suit to require the divestment of GWF. The Justice Department lost that suit, as there was no basis for a regional market to the exclusion of others. Further, Federal's "home flour" market was fragmented between about 50 private-label and non-premium brands, and was also in a steep sales decline from 1965 to 1974. Federal/Dixie-Portland then renovated the plant in 1975.

White Lily was the fourth most popular brand of flour in the US in 1988.

References

Flour mills in the United States
Grinding mills in Tennessee
Manufacturing companies based in Memphis, Tennessee
Defunct manufacturing companies based in Tennessee